Howard Scott Warshaw (born July 30, 1957), also known as HSW, is an American psychotherapist and former game designer. He worked at Atari in the early 1980s, where he designed and programmed the Atari 2600 games Yars' Revenge, Raiders of the Lost Ark, and E.T. the Extra-Terrestrial. 

Warshaw has also written four books, and produced and directed three documentaries.

Early life
Warshaw was "Colorado-born, Jersey-raised, and New Orleans-schooled." He attended Tulane University, where he received a bachelor's degree with a double major in Math and Economics. He graduated Phi Beta Kappa and received a scholarship for his graduate work in Computer Science. One year later, he received his master's degree in Computer Engineering.

Career
After graduation, he was hired at Hewlett-Packard as a multi-terminal systems engineer. Feeling unfulfilled, he began looking for another job. In 1981, he was hired at Atari, Inc.

Atari
Warshaw's first success, Yars' Revenge, had been conceived as an Atari 2600 adaptation of the arcade game Star Castle. However, as limitations became clear, Warshaw re-adapted the concept into a new game involving mutated houseflies defending their world against an alien attacker. The game's working title was Time Freeze. Playtesting by Atari found that the game was popular with women. The game was a major success and is still regarded as one of the best games made for the Atari 2600. This led Warshaw to be chosen to design the game adaptation of the film Raiders of the Lost Ark, which was also a critically acclaimed commercial success.

His success on Raiders likewise made him designer and programmer of the ill-fated Atari 2600 adaptation of the film E.T. the Extra-Terrestrial. Problems began early as he was only given five weeks to go from concept to finished product. Warshaw was assisted by Jerome Domurat, a graphics designer at Atari. Although the game was finished on time, it was poorly received and seen as confusing and frustrating. Atari took a major financial loss on the project which, combined with the company's other poor business decisions and the video game crash of 1983, led to the company being divided and sold within two years. During this time, Warshaw developed and almost finished another game called Saboteur. He left the company before it was completed. It was then re-adapted into a game based on the television series The A-Team but this also remained unfinished. Atari dismantled before either version could be released.

In the 2014 movie Atari: Game Over he is quoted as saying that each of his games had more than 1 million copies sold.

Later work
Following the collapse of Atari, Warshaw wrote two books. The first, The Complete Book of PAN, is a guide to the card game of PAN. In the second, Conquering College, Warshaw discusses his techniques toward academic success, referred to as RASABIC (Read Ahead, Stay Ahead, Be In Class) which enabled him to graduate early and save one full year's tuition.

Later, he studied video production and released the documentary From There to Here: Scenes of Passage, a chronicle of the American immigration of two Russian women from the same family, one in 1920 and the other in 1980. Subsequently, he went on to produce the multi-part documentary Once Upon Atari, a collection of interviews and stories of employees and designers at Atari during the late 1970s and early 1980s. In 2005, he also produced and directed the documentary Vice & Consent, focusing on members of the BDSM scene in San Francisco. This documentary was adopted by Santa Clara University as part of their Human Sexuality program, where Warshaw lectures regularly.

In 2004 classic video game enthusiasts produced cartridges of Saboteur for sale at game expos. It debuted at PhillyClassic 5 where Warshaw appeared to bless the distribution and autograph the cartridges. That year Atari released the Atari Flashback system that includes fifteen Atari 2600 and five Atari 7800 games, including Saboteur.

Warshaw always left his initials as a video game Easter egg. In Raiders of the Lost Ark, the player can find a "Yar". In E.T., the player can find both a "Yar" and an "Indy". In Yars' Revenge, sometimes the enemy will launch itself out of its protective shield at the player; with a well-timed shot, the player can destroy the enemy instead of just avoiding it. When this happens, a black streak will appear in the explosion. If the player stays on this "mean streak" until the explosion is complete, HSWWSH (his initials forward and backward) appear on the screen and end the game.

In 2008, Warshaw guest-starred as himself in the G4TV animated series Code Monkeys in the second-season episode "Dean in Charge".

In 2011, Warshaw received a Master of Arts degree in Counseling Psychology from John F. Kennedy University. He was an intern psychotherapist in private practice specializing in couples and the unique stresses and challenges of Silicon Valley's Hi-tech community.

He has a role in the independent film Angry Video Game Nerd: The Movie. The movie involves the title character digging up the infamous E.T. The Extra-Terrestrial cartridges in the New Mexican landfill where millions of copies are believed to be buried. His role was originally going to be the main role, playing a "mad scientist" version of himself. Because of his involvement in psychotherapy, Warshaw requested to change his role to a cameo, playing as his actual self.

On November 14, 2012, Warshaw became a licensed psychotherapist in California. He has a private practice in Los Altos as well as doing public speaking and training delivery in the  Silicon Valley area.

In June 2013, Warshaw became a contributing artist to the Museum of Modern Art in New York where Yars' Revenge was accepted as a part of the new video game collection. As of that time, this game became part of the museum's second round of additions, out of the first twenty-one total items, in their video game collection which had begun in late 2012.

In early 2020, Warshaw published Inspired Therapist: My inner journey from wannabe to healer, relating "a series of reflections about therapy, what it means to be a therapist, and what it means to live an authentic life"

Also in 2020, Warshaw published a companion volume to his documentary Once Upon Atari, a book entitled Once Upon Atari: How I made history by killing an industry.

References

External links

Warshaw's Conquering College Book
Warshaw's PAN Book
Howard Scott Warshaw profile on MobyGames
Vice & Consent

Inspired Therapist: My inner journey from wannabe to healer

1957 births
American video game designers
Living people
Tulane University alumni
Video game programmers
Atari people